The 2009–10 Top 14 competition was a French domestic rugby union club competition operated by the Ligue Nationale de Rugby (LNR). It began on August 14, 2009 with a match between Toulon and Stade Français at Stade Mayol in Toulon, and continued through to the final at the Stade de France on May 29, 2010.

This year's edition of the Top 14 welcomed Racing Métro, winners of the 2009 title in the second-level Pro D2, and Albi, victors in the 2009 promotion playoffs between the second- through fifth-placed teams in Pro D2, thus becoming the first team to achieve promotion to the Top 14 only one year after being relegated. They took the place of the two clubs from Landes, Dax and Mont-de-Marsan, relegated at the end of the 2008–09 Top 14. Mont-de-Marsan, which had been promoted to the Top 14 for 2008–09, finished bottom of the table and went down. The other newly promoted team in 2008–09, Toulon, finished ninth, sending Dax, who had already finished second-to-bottom the previous season before being allowed to stay in the Top 14 due to Albi's financial troubles, to Pro D2.

The two teams promoted for 2009–10 had very different results. Albi finished bottom of the table by a wide margin and went directly back to Pro D2. Racing Métro, on the other hand, finished sixth, giving them a berth in the newly expanded playoffs and a place in the 2010–11 Heineken Cup. Bayonne finished in the other relegation spot of 13th place, but were reprieved due to the financial problems of 12th-place Montauban.

The season ended with Clermont winning their first French national title in their nearly century-long history, defeating defending champions Perpignan 19–6 in a rematch of last season's final. This result ended decades of frustration for Les Jaunards and their supporters, who had previously tasted defeat in all 10 of their previous final-game appearances.

Teams

Managerial changes
 On 8 September, Stade Français sacked head coach Ewen McKenzie and his assistant Christophe Dominici after a disastrous start to the season put the Parisians in the drop zone. Jacques Delmas and Didier Faugeron were named as co-head coaches. Dominici, who owns a small stake in the club, was expected to remain in some capacity. (Stade Français quickly exited relegation danger, scoring bonus-point wins in three of their next four matches.)
 On 26 October, struggling Brive, lying just above the drop zone at the time, sacked head coach Laurent Seigne. The move came a week after honorary club president Patrick Sébastien resigned. Ugo Mola, previously backs coach for Brive, was promoted to the head coaching position.
 On 7 November, Richard Dourthe resigned at Bayonne after a run of defeats put them in the drop zone. Club president Francis Salagoïty announced later that day that Thierry Mentières and Jean-Philippe Coyola would serve as co-head coaches.
 On 19 March, Stade Français announced a reorganisation effective at the end of the 2009–10 season. Michael Cheika, whose contract with Celtic League side Leinster expires at the end of this season, signed a three-year deal to become Director of Rugby and effective head coach from 2010–11.

Captains and head coaches

Competition format
Each club played every other club twice. The second half of the season is conducted in the same order as the first, with the club at home in the first half of the season away in the second. This season introduced a new format for the knockout stage: the top two teams qualify directly to the semifinals, while teams ranked from third to sixth qualify for a quarterfinal held at the homeground of the higher-ranked team. The semifinals are then held at neutral sites, with the final being played at the Stade de France. This replaced the classical format consisting of semifinals between the top four teams held at neutral sites.

Going into the season, the top six clubs were guaranteed of berths in the 2010–11 Heineken Cup. The winners of the 2009–10 Heineken Cup and European Challenge Cup are assured of berths in the 2010–11 Heineken Cup regardless of their league standing. This means that if a club finishes in the top six and wins one of the European competitions, the seventh-place team will gain a Heineken Cup berth. However, if French clubs win both competitions, only five clubs will qualify for the 2010–11 Heineken Cup via their league position because France is capped at seven Heineken Cup places. France can also secure a seventh berth if clubs from England's Guinness Premiership, also capped at seven Heineken Cup places, win both Cup competitions, and the top club in the European Rugby Club Rankings among those not already qualified for the Heineken Cup is from the Top 14. As it turned out, France earned a seventh berth when Toulouse won the Heineken Cup; because Toulouse had finished fourth on the regular-season table, the extra berth went to seventh-place Biarritz, who were also their opponent in the Heineken Cup final.

The bottom two teams are provisionally relegated to Pro D2, with the possibility of one or both of the bottom teams to be reprieved if a team above them fails a postseason financial audit (mandatory for all clubs in the league).

The LNR used a slightly different bonus points system from that used in most other rugby competitions. It trialled a new system in 2007–08 explicitly designed to prevent a losing team from earning more than one bonus point in a match, a system that also made it impossible for either team to earn a bonus point in a drawn match. The LNR chose to continue with this system for subsequent seasons.

France's bonus point system operated as follows:

4 points for a win.
2 points for a draw.
1 "bonus" point for winning while scoring at least 3 more tries than the opponent. This replaces the standard bonus point for scoring 4 tries regardless of the match result.
1 "bonus" point for losing by 7 points (or less).

Table

Fixtures & Results

Round 1

Round 2

Round 3 

Postponed after six Castres players were diagnosed with H1N1 flu. Game rescheduled to 16 September 2009.

Round 4 

Game postponed due to the H1N1 outbreak in the Castres side. Game to be rescheduled for 29 September 2009.

Round 5

Round 6

Round 3 (rescheduled game)

Game rescheduled from 29 August 2009.

Round 7

Round 8

Round 4 (rescheduled game)

Game rescheduled from 2 September 2009.

Round 9

Round 10

Round 11

Round 12 

Postponed due to unplayable pitch. Game rescheduled to 2 December 2009.

Round 13

Round 14 

Game postponed after Perpignan reported that seven of their traveling party (including both players and coaches) were diagnosed with H1N1 flu. Game to be rescheduled for 5 February 2010.

Round 12 (rescheduled game)

Game rescheduled from 5 November 2009.

Round 15

Round 16

Round 17

Round 18 

Postponed due to unplayable conditions. Game rescheduled to 27 February 2010.

Round 19

Round 14 (rescheduled game)

Game rescheduled from 28 November 2009.

Round 20

Round 18 (rescheduled game)

Game rescheduled from 9 January 2010.

Round 21

Round 22

Round 23

Round 24

Round 25

Round 26

Playoffs

All times are in Central European Summer Time (UTC+2).

Quarter-finals

Semi-finals

Final

Leading scorers
 Note that points scorers includes tries as well as conversions, penalties and drop goals.

Top points scorers

Top try scorers

Awards

Player of the Month
Players were selected by fan vote from a three-player shortlist on the official LNR site, and the results are posted roughly in the middle of the following month. 
{| class=wikitable
|-
!Month
!Player of the Month
!Club
|-
|align=center|August
| Joe van Niekerk
| Toulon
|-
|align=center|September
| Jonny Wilkinson
| Toulon
|-
|align=center|October
| Julien Candelon
| Perpignan
|-
|align=center|November
| colspan=2 |Not awarded — Test window
|}

Attendances

 Attendances do not include the semi-finals or final as these are at neutral venues.

See also
 2009–10 Heineken Cup
 2009–10 Rugby Pro D2 season

Notes

References

External links
  Ligue Nationale de Rugby – Official website
 Top 14 on Planetrugby.com

Top 14 seasons
 
France